Bonox is a beef extract made in Australia, currently owned by Bega Cheese after it acquired the brand from Kraft Heinz in 2017. It is primarily a drink but can also be used as stock in cooking.

History 
Bonox was invented by Camron Thomas for Fred Walker of Fred Walker & Co. in 1918. Bonox was launched the following year.

The Walker company was purchased by Kraft Foods Inc. sometime after Walker's death in 1935. The product was produced by Kraft (from 2012 Kraft Foods, from 2015 Kraft Heinz) until 2017, when Bonox, along with other brands, was sold to Bega Cheese. It kept the same recipe and jar designs.

, Bonox continues to be produced by Bega.

Nutritional information 
This concentrated beef extract contains iron and niacin. It is a thick dark brown liquid paste which can be added to soups or stews for flavoring and can also be added to hot water and served as a beverage.

Approximate per 100g

Energy, including dietary fiber	401	kJ
Moisture	56.6	g
 Protein	16.6	g
 Nitrogen	2.66	g
Fat	0.2	g
Ash	19.8	g
Starch	6.5	g
Available carbohydrate, without sugar alcohols	6.5	g
Available carbohydrate, with sugar alcohols	6.5	g

Minerals

 Calcium (Ca)	110 mg
 Copper (Cu)	0.11 mg
 Fluoride (F)	190 ug
 Iron (Fe)	2 mg
 Magnesium (Mg)	60 mg
 Manganese (Mn)	0.13 mg
 Phosphorus (P)	360 mg
 Potassium (K)	690 mg
 Selenium (Se)	4 ug
 Sodium (Na)	6660 mg
 Sulphur (S)	160 mg
 Zinc (Zn)	1.5 mg

Vitamins

Thiamin (B1)	0.36 mg
Riboflavin (B2)	0.27 mg
Niacin (B3)	5.4 mg
Niacin Equivalents	8.17 mg
Pantothenic acid (B5)	0.38 mg
Pyridoxine (B6)	0.23 mg
Biotin (B7)	12 ug

See also

 Bovril

References

Products introduced in 1919
Food ingredients
Australian brands